Phenylephrine/ketorolac, sold under the brand name Omidria, is a combination drug used during cataract surgery or intraocular lens replacement to prevent intraoperative miosis and to reduce postoperative pain. It contains phenylephrine and ketorolac.

Phenylephrine/ketorolac was approved for medical use in the United States in May 2014, and in the European Union in July 2015.

References

External links 
 

Alpha-1 adrenergic receptor agonists
Combination drugs
Nonsteroidal anti-inflammatory drugs
Ophthalmology
Vasoconstrictors